The Bretton Woods twins refers to the two multilateral organizations created at the Bretton Woods Conference in 1944. Both twin organizations functioned to enact and maintain the Bretton Woods system of proscribed international currency exchange rates. They are the World Bank and the International Monetary Fund.

International Monetary Fund
World Bank